Daniel Dumitru Rogoveanu (born 30 July 1995) is a Romanian professional footballer who plays as a midfielder for CSM Focșani.

Honours
FC U Craiova 1948
Liga III: 2019–20

References

External links
 
 

1995 births
Living people
People from Filiași
Romanian footballers
Association football midfielders
Liga I players
Liga II players
Liga III players
CS Concordia Chiajna players
AFC Chindia Târgoviște players
ACS Poli Timișoara players
FC U Craiova 1948 players
CSM Slatina footballers
CSM Focșani players